The Minority Front is a political party in South Africa. The party represents all minorities of South Africa, however, its support comes mainly from the South African Indian community. Its voter base is in the province of KwaZulu-Natal. The eThekwini district, (Durban), is the cultural and demographic centre of South Africa's Indian community. The party was founded in 1993 and led by Amichand Rajbansi until his death in December 2011.

History 

 The Minority Front was formed as a successor to the National People's Party (NPP), which was an important party led by the late Mr. A. Rajbansi in the Indian-only House of Delegates in the Tricameral Parliament.

Rajbansi's widow and colleague in the KwaZulu-Natal Legislature, Shameen Thakur-Rajbansi, was voted in as leader in January 2012. A leadership and family battle erupted when an attempt was made to replace Thakur-Rajbansi as leader, with Amichand Rajbansi's son, Vimal, and first wife, Asha Devi Rajbansi, asking her to step down, and a breakaway conference (not recognized by the IEC) elected Roy Bhoola, who Thakur-Rajbansi had attempted to remove from public office. Thakur-Rajbansi was declared the undisputed leader in December 2013, after the parties settled their disputes in a confidential agreement.

Election results

National elections 

|-
! Election
! Total votes
! Share of vote
! Seats
! +/–
! Government
|-
! 1994
| 13,433
| 0.07%
| 
| –
| 
|-
! 1999
| 48,277
| 0.30%
| 
|  1
| 
|-
! 2004
| 55,267
| 0.35%
| 
|  1
| 
|-
! 2009
| 43,474
| 0.25%
| 
|  1
| 
|-
! 2014
| 22,589
| 0.12%
| 
|  1
| 
|-
! 2019
| 11,961
| 0.07%
| 
|  ±0
| 
|}

Provincial elections 

! rowspan=2 | Election
! colspan=2 | Eastern Cape
! colspan=2 | Free State
! colspan=2 | Gauteng
! colspan=2 | Kwazulu-Natal
! colspan=2 | Limpopo
! colspan=2 | Mpumalanga
! colspan=2 | North-West
! colspan=2 | Northern Cape
! colspan=2 | Western Cape
|-
! % !! Seats
! % !! Seats
! % !! Seats
! % !! Seats
! % !! Seats
! % !! Seats
! % !! Seats
! % !! Seats
! % !! Seats
|-
! 1994
| - || -
| - || -
| - || -
| 1.34% || 1/80
| - || -
| - || -
| - || -
| - || -
| - || -
|-
! 1999
| - || -
| - || -
| - || -
| 2.93% || 2/80
| - || -
| - || -
| - || -
| - || -
| - || -
|-
! 2004
| - || -
| - || -
| - || -
| 2.61% || 2/80
| - || -
| - || -
| - || -
| - || -
| - || -
|-
! 2009
| - || -
| - || -
| - || -
| 2.05% || 2/80
| - || -
| - || -
| - || -
| - || -
| - || -
|-
! 2014
| - || -
| - || -
| 0.07% || 0/73
| 1.02% || 1/80
| - || -
| - || -
| - || -
| - || -
| - || -
|-
! 2019
| - || -
| - || -
| - || -
| 0.52% || 1/80
| - || -
| - || -
| - || -
| - || -
| - || -
|}

Municipal elections 

|-
! Election
! Votes
! %
|-
! 1995–96
|
|
|-
! 2000
|
| 0.3%
|-
! 2006
| 84,785
| 0.3%
|-
! 2011
| 113,195
| 0.4%
|-
! 2016
| 13,407
| 0.03%
|-
! 2021
| 8,304
| 0.03%
|-
|}

Organisation and Structure

Head Office 
The Minority Front's primary office is at 13175 Peak Street, Arena Park, Westcliff, Chatsworth, Durban.

Minority Front Women's League

Minority Front Youth League

Minority Front: National Assembly

Minority Front Leadership

Events

References 

1993 establishments in South Africa
Indian diaspora in South Africa
Political parties established in 1993
Political parties in South Africa
Political parties of minorities